The IV Games of the Small States of Europe were held in 1991 by the Principality of Andorra.

Competitions

Medals count
Final Table:

References

San Marino Olympic Committee

 
Games of the Small States of Europe
Games Of The Small States Of Europe, 1991
Games Of The Small States Of Europe
Games of the Small States of Europe
Games of the Small States of Europe
International sports competitions hosted by Andorra
Multi-sport events in Andorra